Qaraqaya (also, Karakaya) is a village and municipality in the Ismailli Rayon of Azerbaijan.  It has a population of 667. The municipality consists of the villages of Qaraqaya, Köhnədaxar, and Gəndov.

References 

Populated places in Ismayilli District